Christie is a census-designated place (CDP) in Adair County, Oklahoma, United States. The population was 218 at the 2010 census, a 31.3 percent increase over the figure of 166 recorded in 2000.

Geography
Christie is located at  (35.949018, -94.647545).

Demographics

As of the census of 2000, there were 166 people, 65 households, and 52 families residing in the CDP. The population density was 21.4 people per square mile (8.3/km2). There were 70 housing units at an average density of 9.0/sq mi (3.5/km2). The racial makeup of the CDP was 58.43% White, 0.60% African American, 30.12% Native American, and 10.84% from two or more races. Hispanic or Latino of any race were 0.60% of the population.

There were 65 households, out of which 32.3% had children under the age of 18 living with them, 58.5% were married couples living together, 15.4% had a female householder with no husband present, and 20.0% were non-families. 15.4% of all households were made up of individuals, and 7.7% had someone living alone who was 65 years of age or older. The average household size was 2.55 and the average family size was 2.83.

In the CDP, the population was spread out, with 24.1% under the age of 18, 7.8% from 18 to 24, 29.5% from 25 to 44, 21.7% from 45 to 64, and 16.9% who were 65 years of age or older. The median age was 38 years. For every 100 females, there were 107.5 males. For every 100 females age 18 and over, there were 93.8 males.

The median income for a household in the CDP was $19,063, and the median income for a family was $27,656. Males had a median income of $25,893 versus $17,143 for females. The per capita income for the CDP was $9,268. About 17.8% of families and 17.0% of the population were below the poverty line, including 12.5% of those under the age of eighteen and 28.0% of those 65 or over.

References

Census-designated places in Adair County, Oklahoma
Census-designated places in Oklahoma